The 1956 Belgian Grand Prix was a Formula One motor race held on 3 June 1956 at Spa-Francorchamps. It was race 4 of 8 in the 1956 World Championship of Drivers.

After the first day of practice on Thursday, Fangio was on pole with a time almost 5 sec faster than second place Moss. These times would not be touched with wet conditions on Friday and windy conditions on Saturday.

It was raining when the race began and Fangio made a poor start and settled in fifth with Moss well in the lead. But by lap 3 Fangio would be in second having passed Behra, Collins, and then Castellotti. By the fifth lap he was in the lead and had opened up an 8-second lead on Moss by lap 10 with Collins third on a drying track. Collins took second when Moss lost a back wheel on the climb after the Eau Rouge bridge. He was able to safely stop and sprint back to the pits and take over Perdisa's car. He resumed in sixth but a lap down to the leaders. Collins took the lead for good when Fangio lost his transmission on lap 24. A tight battle for second between Behra and Frere ended when Behra's engine began to misfire. This allowed Moss to move to third as he had passed Schell earlier. Moss ended the race on a furious pace but the two leaders were too far ahead to make up the gap.

Classification

Qualifying

Race

Notes
 – Includes 1 point for fastest lap

Shared drive
 Car #34: Perdisa (13 laps) and Moss (23 laps).

Championship standings after the race 
Drivers' Championship standings

Note: Only the top five positions are included.

References

Belgian Grand Prix
Belgian Grand Prix
Grand Prix
Belgian Grand Prix